Isaiah Kwaku Osei-Duah is a Ghanaian politician and was a member of the first parliament of the second Republic of Ghana. He represented the Asutifi constituency under the membership of the progress party (PP).

Early life and education 
Osei-Duah was born in 1933. He attended Surveyors School Accra and Kwame Nkrumah University of Science and Technology (KNUST). He holds certificates in Land Surveying and Estate Management. He later worked as a Surveyor, Farmer and Trader before going into parliament.

Politics 
Osei-Duah) began his political career in 1969 when he became the parliamentary candidate for the Progress Party (PP) to represent the  Asutifi Constituency prior to the commencement of the 1969 Ghanaian parliamentary election.

He was sworn into the First Parliament of the Second Republic of Ghana on 1 October 1969, after being pronounced winner at the 1969 Ghanaian election held on 26 August 1969. His tenure of office as a member of parliament ended on 13 January 1972.

Personal life
Osei-Duah is a Christian.

References 

Ghanaian MPs 1969–1972
1933 births
Living people
Kwame Nkrumah University of Science and Technology alumni
People from Brong-Ahafo Region
Progress Party (Ghana) politicians
Ghanaian farmers
Surveyors
20th-century Ghanaian politicians